Most Beautiful Girl in Nigeria – often abbreviated as MBGN – is a pageant organised by Silverbird Group with the main purpose of sending representatives to international competitions. Originally known as Miss Universe Nigeria, it was renamed Most Beautiful Girl in Nigeria after news publishers Daily Times lost their license to send delegates from rival contest Miss Nigeria to Miss World. Since 2005, the pageant has produced multiple representatives, but the MBGN World recipient is considered the overall winner. 

The current titleholder is event planner Ada Eme who represented Abia.

History
Former publisher Ben Murray-Bruce ventured into show business after his magazine Silverbird flopped. He took a loan of N200,000 from his father which he used to organise a number of successful concerts which saw artists like Shalamar and Kool and the Gang perform in Nigeria, after which he promoted a new pageant known as Miss Universe Nigeria in 1983 (Omololu Ojehomon was crowned winner but never competed in Miss Universe). Murray-Bruce's pageant only gained public attention after Miss Nigeria Universe metamorphosed into Most Beautiful Girl in Nigeria in 1986, and its first winner was model Lynda Chuba.

MBGN winners were expected to represent Nigeria at Miss World and, until 2004, Miss Universe. Chuba was the first Nigerian in twenty-three years to compete after Edna Park in 1964, while the first MBGN winner at Miss World was English Language student Omasan Buwa in 1987. As with most pageants, second-place winners are expected to replace the title-holder if they are unable to complete their reign; in MBGN this has only happened twice – Biology student Regina Askia replaced Bianca Onoh after the latter resigned in 1989, while Philosophy student Ann Suinner continued Agbani Darego's reign after the latter was crowned Miss World in 2001.

Winners traditionally adopt at least one platform (also known as 'pet project') during their reign – an issue which is of relevance to Nigeria. Once chosen, the winner (and occasionally other finalists) uses their status to address the public about their platform. The most popular was initially Sickle cell Awareness, but others have included Polio, Child labour, Education, and Widow Empowerment.

In 2007, Silverbird announced that the pageant would produce four more representatives apart from the winner. The original titles were Miss MBGN Universe (to represent at Miss Universe), MBGN Tourism (Miss Tourism International), and MBGN Ecowas (Miss Ecowas). A fifth title, MBGN Model, which allowed its holder to compete in modelling contests at international level, was dropped and replaced with MBGN Ambassador, with its winner performing ceremonial duties in the country. In 2021, MBGN acquired the Miss Supranational franchise. 
The differences between MBGN and Miss Nigeria have been compared with Miss USA and Miss America. While MBGN delegates compete at international level, Miss Nigeria winners no longer have this privilege. In 2010 Miss Nigeria was relaunched as a scholarship programme and its winners in recent years receive modelling contract as part of their prize. MBGN focuses mainly on physical beauty unlike Miss Nigeria which is expected to promote inner beauty with a wholesome girl-next-door image – as a result its swimsuit competition was famously scrapped in 2010 but this feature remains popular at MBGN.

Competition
Screening exercises (also known as 'auditions') are held nationwide to select contestants, and successful contestants will be coached on etiquette and stage presence at the boot-camp before competing at the finale, where segments include Interview and Evening Gown, and unlike Miss Nigeria, Swimwear. In the pageant's early days, contestants were allowed to wear one-pieces of their choice for the swimsuit competition. Identical bikinis are now used instead. In 2014, a talent competition was introduced as part of the preliminaries.

In the mid-nineties, after Nigeria yet again failed to place at Miss Universe and Miss World, MBGN organisers placed height and weight restrictions on contestants, and judges were advised not to select the woman they found most attractive, but the contestant with a greater chance of winning at international pageants.

Due to the country's conservative standards, very few contestants competed in the early days of MBGN, and competitors from Northern Nigeria are still rare as its predominantly Muslim population frown on beauty pageants. Guy Murray-Bruce, who succeeded his brother as pageant director in 1992 told The Guardian: "Getting the girls to come and participate was hard, and we literally had to beg them to participate. But since (former Miss World) Agbani [Darego] won it in 2001, we don’t beg anyone anymore."

Prizes for the winner vary each year, but have always included cash; as of 2012, it stands at N3,000,000, and most winners have received cars.

Winners
MBGN's 1988 winner, law student Bianca Onoh, was crowned Miss Africa in 1988. She also won the Miss Congeniality Prize at the Miss Charm Pageant held in Moscow in 1989, and was crowned as Miss Intercontinental in 1989, 
and Theatre graduate Sabina Umeh was the first Nigerian to win the Personality prize at Miss World 1990. Toyin Raji was the recipient in 1995, despite withdrawing from the pageant due to political protests. Prior to this, Raji had been named Miss Congeniality at Miss Universe 1995.

At least three MBGN winners have previously competed in Miss Nigeria: Omasan Buwa (1987), Sylvia Nduka (2010), and Isabella Ayuk (2004) Miss Nigeria 2002, Sylvia Edem, was in the top five at MBGN 1998, as were Miss Nigeria 1993, Pharmacy graduate Janet Fateye, who had competed in MBGN 1992 as Kemi Fateye,  and Mass Communications student Vien Tetsola who was named the "Millennium Queen" in 2000.

Many MBGN winners have pursued careers in entertainment, including Sabina Umeh, Regina Askia, Emma Komlosy, Celia Bissong, and Munachi Nwankwo. Lynda Chuba-Ikpeazu and Omasan Buwa have moved into politics, as has Bianca Onoh who became a presidential adviser, as well as an ambassador and Nigeria's Permanent Representative to the UNWTO while Nike Oshinowo has worked in pageantry.

International crowns 
 One Miss World winner: Agbani Darego (2001)
 One Miss Intercontinental winner: Bianca Onoh (1989)
 Two Miss Africa winners: 
 Lynda Chuba (1987)
 Bianca Onoh (1989)
 Two Miss ECOWAS winners: 
 May Ikeora (2003)
 Joy Ngozika Obasi (2009)
 Zirra Banu (2012)

Titleholders

1986-2005

2006

2007-2019

Notes

2017-2019

2021-present

Other notable contestants
Chidinma Aaron, Miss Nigeria 2018
Lilian Bach , actress
Kehinde Bankole, model and actress
Damilola Bolarinde, TNQ 2022
Sylvia Edem, Miss Nigeria 2002
Janet Fateye , singer and Miss Nigeria 1993
Yemi Fawaz† , model and actress 
Ibinabo Fiberesima, actress
 Nengi Hampson , reality TV personality and TNQ 2013 (b)
May Ikeora, lawyer, Miss Ecowas 2003 and executive director, Miss Nigeria
 Alex Lopez, actress
Erica Nlewedim, actress, model, and reality TV personality
Chikaodili Nna-Udosen, TNQ 2020
Stephanie Okereke, actress
Maristella Okpara, Miss Earth Nigeria 2018
 Grace Oboba, actress/producer
Ebinabo Potts-Johnson, model
Gloria 'Giomanni' Ziregbe, singer
Patricia Osita Onumonu, model, fashion designer
Vien Tetsola, pastor and Miss Nigeria 2000

Awards
The awards most frequently presented at MBGN are Miss Photogenic, Miss Amity, and Best Traditional Costume.

From 2007 to 2012, soft drink marketers La Casera, in conjunction with MBGN, chose a contestant to be the face of their brand. The winner of the title, Miss La Casera, promoted their product and worked on various projects reaching out to society's less privileged. The Miss La Casera winner also received a car and N1,000,000.

Controversy
In 1989, several months after winning Miss Intercontinental, Bianca Onoh resigned after tabloids exposed her secret relationship with former Biafran leader and Ikemba of Nnewi, Chukwuemeka Odumegwu Ojukwu, a political associate of her father over thirty years her senior, sparking outrageous rumors – Climax magazine falsely claimed Onoh was pregnant. Although the couple never confirmed the relationship until their wedding in 1994, pageant organisers Silverbird were furious as MBGN title-holders are said to be discouraged from high-profile relationships during their tenure. Onoh later stated that the pressure of performing her duties as a pageant queen was unbearable, which explained her decision to hand over her crown to second-place winner Regina Askia who completed the remainder of Onoh's tenure as MBGN.

Actress Ibinabo Fiberesima has said in numerous interviews that she had competed in 1998 and emerged second runner-up, but this statement is questionable as the person who had actually placed third was International Relations student Sylvia Edem, who would later win Miss Nigeria in 2002.

In 2011, a day after the final, judges complained that the name announced as the winner was not the panel's choice. Sylvia Nduka, who most believed was an undeserving winner, was asked by a reporter why she had failed to promptly respond to a question during the interview stage, and she replied that she was unprepared, as MBGN was her first pageant. However YouTube videos have revealed that Accountancy student Nduka had contested in Miss Nigeria 2010 where she received coaching in etiquette and media and participated in the competition's reality show, but failed to make the final ten at the grand finale in Abuja – reports claim that an enraged Nduka, who had represented Kaduna, refused to return to the stage during eventual winner Damilola Agbajor's coronation and even smashed her 'Miss Kaduna' plaque. Silverbird later defended Nduka, stating "Everybody will always have something to say when someone wins. Even when Agbani Darego won in 2001, people talked. And as for [Nduka] goofing her questions, it's just a case of her being nervous, I spoke with her at the after-party of the pageant and she was quite eloquent."

2012 winner Isabella Ayuk claimed to be twenty-six when she competed, until reports suggested that she had forged her age, thus giving the impression that she was younger than her actual years (she was said to be thirty). Despite a public outcry, pageant director Guy Murray-Bruce stated that Ayuk would not be dethroned and will continue to serve as the reigning queen. However, due to age restrictions, she did not represent Nigeria at Miss World that year.

Shortly after Agbani Darego's victory at Miss World, Miss Nigeria 2001 Amina Ekpo took legal action against her MBGN counterpart whom she accused of misrepresentation, stating that Darego had fraudulently presented herself as "Miss Nigeria" at the international pageant, and had not been authorised to use the title. Former Daily Times managing director Onukaba Adinoyi Ojo, who had famously described MBGN winners as "lowly-rated queens" at the Miss Nigeria 2001 grand finale, supported the $10,000,000 lawsuit, claiming "We will do everything possible to make sure we prevent people from tampering with a patented pageant like Miss Nigeria, [and] will not allow anybody to misrepresent us."

Titleholders under MBGN

Most Beautiful Girl in Nigeria Universe

The MBGN Universe represents her country at the Miss Universe pageant. Before 2005, MBGN winners represented Nigeria at both Miss Universe and Miss World. On occasion, when the official representative failed to qualify due to age restrictions or was unavailable, runners-up were sent instead.

Most Beautiful Girl in Nigeria World

The MBGN World titleholder represents her country at the Miss World pageant. Before MBGN, Miss World Nigeria sent their second-place winner Gina Onyejiaka, to Miss World 1963. Miss Nigeria, the official national pageant, held the franchise from 1964 to 1986 until MBGN took over the franchise. On occasion, when the winner does not qualify (due to age), a runner-up is sent.

Most Beautiful Girl in Nigeria Supranational

The MBGN Supranational represents her country at the Miss Supranational pageant.

See also

 Miss Nigeria
 The Nigerian Queen
 Mr Nigeria

References

External links
MBGN website

 
1986 establishments in Nigeria
Nigerian awards
Beauty pageants in Nigeria
Nigeria
Recurring events established in 1986